Sieverne may refer to the following places in Ukraine:

Crimea
Sieverne, Bilohirsk Raion Raion, Crimea, village in Bilohirsk Raion
Sieverne, Chornomorske Raion, Crimea, village in Chornomorske Raion
Sieverne, Rozdolne Raion, Crimea, village in Rozdolne Raion

Donetsk Oblast
Sieverne (urban-type settlement), Donetsk Oblast, urban-type settlement in Volnovakha Raion
Sieverne (settlement), Donetsk Oblast, rural settlement in Pokrovsk Raion